Fernández Alonso is a town in Bolivia. In 2010 it had an estimated population of 8,922. It is the seat of the Municipality Fernández Alonso. It was named after Severo Fernández Alonso.

References

Populated places in Santa Cruz Department (Bolivia)